Ben Dreith (February 1, 1925April 25, 2021) was an American professional football on-field official who worked from 1960 to 1969 in the American Football League (AFL) and from 1970 to 1990 in the National Football League (NFL). Prior to his teaching and officiating career, he was a three-sport athlete at the University of Northern Colorado.

Dreith developed a reputation of being a no-nonsense, tough-minded official on the field.  During his thirty-year career, he officiated two Super Bowls, and received a playoff assignment for twenty-eight consecutive years.

College
Dreith was a 1950 graduate of the University of Northern Colorado in Greeley (then known as the Colorado State College of Education), where he played baseball, basketball, and football.  He was a four-time all-conference selection in baseball and two-time in basketball, and later worked as a teacher for Denver Public Schools.

Officiating career
He was the referee during Super Bowl VIII and Super Bowl XV and was assigned eight conference championship games. Dreith also was an alternate official in Super Bowl II;  he wore uniform number 12, which is now worn by Greg Steed.

In 1983 in his typical no-nonsense fashion, in a late season game between the Steelers and Browns, Dreith ejected Jack Lambert from the game for a late hit on Brian Sipe in what turned out to be Sipe's final NFL game.  Dreith is also known among football fans for his unique explanation of a personal foul penalty during a  game between the Buffalo Bills and the New York Jets. After the Jets' Marty Lyons (misidentified as Mark Gastineau during Dreith's call) tackled Bills quarterback Jim Kelly to the ground and started to repeatedly punch him in the head, Dreith announced to the crowd: "There's a personal foul, on number 99 (Lyons actually wore 93) of the defense — after he tackled the quarterback, he's givin' him the business down there, that's a 15-yard penalty." Dreith's call also involved an improvised hand signal of a repeated punching action. Twenty-one years later, on November 24, 2007, during a game between University of Maryland and North Carolina State University, ACC referee Ron Cherry called a personal foul, saying, "He was giving him the business." Cherry did not use Dreith's hand signal. David Letterman stated he wanted the previous sentence to be a topic for Know Your Current Events.

Age discrimination lawsuit
By , Dreith reached the age of 65 and the league asked him to move into the instant replay booth. He refused and was demoted to line judge. Dreith was fired after the season, thus prompting him to send a complaint to the Equal Employment Opportunity Commission (EEOC).

On February 13, 1991, the EEOC ruled that the NFL had violated the Age Discrimination in Employment Act by illegally demoting Dreith. After attempts to reach a compromise with the league, the EEOC sued the NFL on August 13. In the first-ever lawsuit filed by the agency against Professional Football for age discrimination, the EEOC claimed that the NFL unfairly reviewed the job performance of older referees more closely than that of younger officials. The EEOC also noted that the league's performance ratings showed that Dreith performed better than some of the younger officials who were retained.

On January 5, 1993, Dreith and the NFL agreed to a $165,000 settlement, plus court costs and attorney fees.

Death

Ben Dreith died on April 25, 2021 at age 96.

See also
 List of American Football League officials

References

1925 births
2021 deaths
Sportspeople from Denver
American Football League officials
National Football League officials
Northern Colorado Bears baseball players
Northern Colorado Bears football players
Northern Colorado Bears men's basketball players
American men's basketball players
Baseball players from Denver
Basketball players from Denver
Players of American football from Denver